Babbage is an English surname. Notable people with the surname include:

Benjamin Herschel Babbage (1815–1878), Australian engineer
Bob Babbage (born 1951), American politician
Charles Babbage (1791–1871), English mathematician, mechanical engineer, and pioneering computer scientist
Charles Whitmore Babbage (1842–1923), Australian embezzler and prominent citizen of Wanganui, New Zealand 
Dennis Babbage (1909–1991), English mathematician
Dugald Bromhead Babbage (1823–1881), Australian surveyor
Eden Herschel Babbage (c. 1844–1924), prominent citizen of Roseville, New South Wales, Australia
Frank Babbage (1858–1916), English animal painter and wood-engraver
Herbert Ivan Babbage (1875–1916), New Zealand artist
Lisa Noel Babbage (born 1971), Educator, author, and American politician
Ross Babbage (born 1949), defense analyst
Stuart Babbage (1916–2012), Anglican priest

English-language surnames